CER ( – Digital Electronic Computer) model 203 is an early digital computer developed by Mihajlo Pupin Institute (Serbia) in 1971. It was designed to process data of medium-sized businesses:
 In banks, for managing and processing of accounts, bookkeeping, foreign-currency and interest calculations, amortization plans and statistics
 In manufacturing, for production planning and management, market data processing and forecasting, inventory management, financial document management and process modelling
 In utilities, to calculate water and electricity consumption, to produce various reportsand lists and for technical calculations and design
 In construction industry for network planning method design, financial management and bookkeeping
 In trading companies for payment processing, market analysis, inventory management and customer and partner relationship management

Specifications
Central Processing:
 Type: BMS-203
 Number of instructions: 32
 Performance:
 one 16-cycle instruction: 20 μs
 one single cycle instruction: 5 μs
 addition and/or subtraction of two 15-digit numbers: 20 μs

Primary memory:
 Capacity: 8 kilowords
 Speed (cycle time): 1 μs
 Complete, autonomous memory error checking
 Parity control

Punched tape reader:
 Dielectric-based reading
 Speed: 500 to 1,000 characters per second
 Accepts 5, 7 and 8-channel tapes

Tape puncher:
 Speed: 75 characters per second

Parallel Line Printer 667:
 "On the fly" printing
 128 characters per line
 Removable/replaceable printing cylinder
 Speed:
 500 lines per minute for a character set of 63 characters
 550 lines per minute for a character set of 50 characters
 Automatic paper feeder
 Two line spacing settings
 Programamtic tape for discontinuous paper movement
 Maximum number of carbon copies: 6

Independent Printer M 30:
 132 characters per line
 Speed:
 Prints 25 alphanumeric characters per second
 Prints 33 numeric characters per second
 Tabulation speed: 144 characters per second
 Blank printing speed: 100 characters per second
 Maximum number of carbon copies: 6

Magnetic cassettes 4096:
 Capacity: 600,000 characters
 Variable record length
 Transfer rate: 857 characters per second
 Tape speed: 10 inches per second

Magnetic Tape Drives:
 Data format: 9-track ASCII with inter-record space of 0.6 inches (1.524 cm)
 Data density: 556/800 bits per inch
 Capacity per tape:  10,000,000 characters
 Tape speed: 24 inches/s, 150 inches/s fast-forward and rewind
 Transfer rate: 19.2 kHz
 Tape width: 1/2 inch (1.27 cm)
 Tape length: 2400 ft (731.52 m)
 Working ambient temperature range: 5 °C to 40 °C
 Relative humidity: up to 80%
 Integrated circuit control logic
 Separate control panel for each drive
 Read/Write Capabilities:
 Read and Write forward
 Read forward
 Read reverse

See also
 CER Computers
 Mihajlo Pupin Institute
 History of computer hardware in the SFRY

References
 M.Momcilovic, D.Hristovic, P.Vrbavac et al.:"Domaci cifarski el.racunari CER", Zbornik Savetovanja AOP u preduzecima, pp. 38–58, Nova Varos YU, May 22, 1969. (in Serbian);
  Miodrag Momcilovic, Miladin Dabic:"Domaci el. sistem za obradu podataka CER 203", Proc.of the VI yougoslav Symposium on AOP, Zagreb, 1972. (in Serbian).

Mihajlo Pupin Institute
CER computers